Gyal may refer to:
 Gyál, Hungary
 Gal, Azerbaijan 
 Gyal, Iran